Firehouse Dog is a 2007 American family film produced by Regency Enterprises and distributed by 20th Century Fox. Directed by Todd Holland, it stars Josh Hutcherson, Bruce Greenwood, Dash Mihok, Steven Culp and Bill Nunn. It was released April 4, 2007, in the U.S.

Plot

Dog superstar Rexxx lives the high life-with adoring crowds, a loving owner and an array of best-selling blockbusters under his belt. However, when his owner, Trey (Dash Mihok) tries to convince him to perform a skydiving stunt, the plane malfunctions caused by a lightning strike and Rexxx is sent tumbling from the sky, landing in a tomato truck. Whilst Trey mourns his apparent death and begins to regret not treating him like a 'real dog', Rexxx settles into an abandoned warehouse, desperately missing his owner.

Meanwhile in the city of South Harbor in Lincoln County, Shane Fahey (Josh Hutcherson) is struggling with the death of his Uncle, Capt. Marc Fahey (Randy Triggs), and Blue (The former "Firehouse Dog") after being trapped in a fire in a disused Textile Mill. Realizing he forgot to study for a test, Shane ditches school, but is quickly caught by two other firefighters, Lionel and new recruit Terrence (Scotch Ellis Loring and Teddy Sears). Arriving back at the fire station (known as 'Dogpatch' home to Engine 55 & Rescue 26)in disgrace, he is chastised by both driver Joe (Bill Nunn) and his father Connor (Bruce Greenwood), the recently promoted Captain of the station, who is having problems of his own; the station is about to be closed due to a lack of funding and overall bad publicity. However, before Connor can properly address his son's problems, Dogpatch is called out to put out a fire in a warehouse. The fire is quickly put out, but Shane notices a terrified Rexxx balancing on top of the burning building; Connor manages to rescue him, and orders Shane to put up 'Lost Dog' flyers. Due to the name on his collar, which is a prop from the filming at the time of Rexxx's accident, the station renames the dog 'Dewey', and keeps him at the station until someone comes to claim him.

Whilst city manager Zachary Hayden (Steven Culp) reminds Connor of the station's upcoming shutdown, Shane struggles to cope with Dewey's spoilt needs and strange habits. Realizing that the dog is fast and active, Shane enters him in a firefighter's competition, where they are pitted against rival fire station Engine 26 Greenpoint. Although Dewey initially beats the other station's score, he is distracted by their Dalmatian, who reminds him of a female Dalmatian that broke his heart. Despite losing the competition, Shane and Dewey begin to bond.

The next morning, the station is called out to a tunnel collapse. Everyone has already been evacuated upon their arrival, but Capt. Fahey spots that a firefighter is unaccounted for and initiates a search. Connor rushes into the wreckage, and Shane, fearing for his father's safety, allows Dewey to run in after him. Dewey manages to alert Connor to Jessie's presence, subsequently saving her life. Following this, the station begins to gain popularity, as they realize that Dewey could become a potential firehouse dog. Due to this change in circumstances, Zachary notifies them that the station is saved.

However, Shane's excitement is lost when he discovers his father has moved to his uncle's former office. Angered that his dad is trying to take his uncle's place, he roots through the files, where he discovers an unnerving number of suspected arsons, within the general area of the station. Upset that Shane felt he was being neglected, Connor makes an effort to reconcile with his son, and is shocked when Shane reveals that he feels guilty for being relieved that it was his uncle who died instead of his father. Later on that night, Dewey is awarded a medal for his bravery at a firefighter's gala. However, he ends up reuniting with Trey upon spotting him amongst the attendees: Connor reluctantly allows an ecstatic Trey to keep the dog.

A few hours later, however, Dewey escapes Trey's hotel room to chase after the station's engine, which was called out to another fire. The team is only too happy to allow him to climb on board. At the fire they struggle to put it out; meanwhile, Shane returns to the station to discover that the fire was simply a decoy, so that the suspected arsonist could burn the "Dogpatch" station to the ground. Panicking, he calls his friend, Jasmine 'JJ' Presley (Hannah Lochner) to work out what to do, before hearing footsteps upstairs, which turn out to be the arsonist.

Ignoring JJ's warnings, he heads upstairs to confront the arsonist. To his horror, he realizes that the arsonist is in fact city manager Zach Hayden, who wanted to burn buildings in order to build a football stadium for Corbin Sellars (Matt Cooke) - killing Shane's uncle in the process. After the station's closure was denied, he had no choice but to burn it down himself, but didn't realize that Shane was still in the building. The two become trapped inside the burning building when Zach's incendiary device ignites. Shane loses consciousness and Zach is forced to leave the building. 
 
Meanwhile, Dewey - sensing that Shane is in danger - races back to the station as Connor follows behind, having been alerted to the fire by Jessie. Dewey finds Zach trying to escape, and traps him in a phone booth (which he also escapes from) before finding Shane. Dewey revives him by licking him and then Shane and Dewey try to find a way out of the burning fire station. Connor arrives on the scene, only to find the station completely inaccessible. Hearing Dewey's barking, he eventually manages to break down the garage door and finds a terrified Shane. Shane manages to convince him to pass him his axe through some broken glass so he can try to break the hinges himself; Dewey then leads them out. Shane manages to tell Connor about Zach’s arson attacks before he is put on oxygen. Furious, Connor confronts Zach and Pep gets her own payback on him before the other Dogpatch firefighters hand him over to the police.

Corbin Sellars' scam is exposed and he is also arrested. Following the events of the fire, all of the firefighters of the station are awarded medals, including Shane and Dewey. Upon seeing how happy Dewey is with them, Trey allows Shane to keep him, adding that now that Dewey has been a true hero, he won't be content with just acting like one. Both Shane and Connor are overjoyed, with Dewey realizing his true potential as a firehouse dog. "Dogpatch" is repaired and restored from the fire damage it sustained, and the station receives a brand-new 900bhp engine.

Cast
 Josh Hutcherson as Shane Fahey
 Bruce Greenwood as Firefighter/Captain Connor Fahey (Engine 55)
 Dash Mihok as Trey Falcon
 Steven Culp as City Manager Zachary "Zach" Hayden
 Bill Nunn as Driver/Engineer Joe Musto - The Station Cook, Engine Driver & Pump Operator (Engine 55)
 Bree Turner as Liz Knowles
 Scotch Ellis Loring as Firefighter Lionel Bradford (Engine 55/Rescue 26)
 Mayte Garcia as Firefighter Pep Clemente - The Station Mechanic (Engine 55)
 Teddy Sears as Probie Firefighter Terrence Kahn (Engine 55/Rescue 26)
 Claudette Mink as Captain Jessie Presley (Engine 24)
 Hannah Lochner as Jasmine "J.J." Presley 
 Matt Cooke as City Chief Corbin Sellars
 Shane Daly as Firefighter Burr Baldwin (Engine 24)
 Randy Triggs as Captain Marc Fahey (Engine 55)
 Arwen, Frodo, Rohan, Stryder as Rexxx/Dewey the Dog

Production notes

Rexxx/Dewey is played in the film by four different Irish Terriers named Arwen, Frodo, Rohan and Stryder, named after the characters/location from The Lord of the Rings story.

The film was shot in Toronto and Hamilton, Ontario, Canada.

The building used to portray the fire station is located at 455 Cherry Street in Toronto. The garage section of the building was built specifically for the movie and was torn down after production. This area of Toronto has changed greatly since the movie was filmed.

Release

The film was filmed in 2005 but was released in 2007.

Home media

The film was released on DVD on July 31, 2007.

Reception
Firehouse Dog received mainly mixed to negative reviews from film critics. From 82 critics, it garnered 38% positive reviews on the film-critic aggregate site Rotten Tomatoes, and a 43/100 on Metacritic from 20 reviews. Justin Chang of Variety called it, "A likable but ungainly mutt of a movie". Ty Burr in The Boston Globe found "the human scenes in Firehouse Dog are perfectly acceptable on the level of a heartwarming family B-movie" but "that dog—or, rather, that digitally enhanced replicant—is just plain creepy". While Carrie Rickey of The Philadelphia Inquirer called it "a touching, family-friendly entertainment about a dog and his boy",

Chris Kaltenbach of The Baltimore Sun felt it was "too busy being inspirational and cuddly to be funny or pointed" and "plays out as though its plot was stuck in molasses". Frank Lovece of Film Journal International capped his review by suggesting that, "Firehouse Dog should be put to sleep before it can do the same to audiences". Michael Phillips of the Chicago Tribune (April 11, 2007) says: "Once it figures out it is more drama than comedy, "Firehouse Dog" exceeds your limited expectations....While the movie's ad campaign suggests wacky antics all the way, a surprisingly affecting and well-acted father/son relationship develops."

See also
 List of American films of 2007
 List of firefighting films

References

External links
 
 
 
 Rotten Tomatoes: Firehouse Dog
 Metacritic: Firehouse Dog

2007 films
Films about dogs
Films about firefighting
Films about pets
Films shot in Hamilton, Ontario
20th Century Fox films
Regency Enterprises films
Films with screenplays by Michael Colleary
American children's comedy films
2000s English-language films
Films directed by Todd Holland
2000s American films